Apoanagyrus lopezi is a species of parasitic wasp native to Central America. It is used as biological control agent against the cassava mealybug (Phenacoccus manihoti).

Large-scale deployment of this parasitoid was done in Africa  and was successfully achieved in Thailand and several other Southeast Asian countries in 2010. 

In 2010, huge number (lakhs) of wasp were airdropped in Thailand to control mealy bug and the results were amazing. 

In 1980 also these wasp were used to control mealy bug in cassava fields of west Africa and reduces pest population by 80–90%.

External links

References 

Encyrtidae
Insects described in 1964